The 1953 CCCF Championship was a tournament sanctioned by the Confederacion Centroamericana y del Caribe de Futbol (Football Confederation of Central America and the Caribbean), the governing body of association football in Central America and the nations in the Caribbean prior to 1961, when it was replaced by CONCACAF.

Following are the results of the Final Group of the 1953 CCCF Championship, which was hosted by Costa Rica.

Final standings

Results

External links
 CCCF Championship on RSSSF Archive

CCCF Championship
International association football competitions hosted by Costa Rica
Cccf Championship, 1953
CCCF
CCCF
1953 in Costa Rica
March 1953 sports events in North America
Sports competitions in San José, Costa Rica
20th century in San José, Costa Rica